The Nutshell Studies of Unexplained Death are a series of nineteen intricately designed dollhouse-style dioramas created by Frances Glessner Lee (1878–1962), a pioneer in forensic science. Glessner Lee used her inheritance to establish a department of legal medicine at Harvard Medical School in 1936, and donated the first of the Nutshell Studies in 1946 for use in lectures on the subject of crime scene investigation. In 1966, the department was dissolved, and the dioramas went to the Maryland Medical Examiner's Office in Baltimore, Maryland, U.S. where they are on permanent loan and still used for forensic seminars.

The dioramas are detailed representations of death scenes that are composites of actual court cases, created by Glessner Lee on a 1-inch to 1 foot (1:12) scale. She attended autopsies to ensure accuracy, and her attention to detail extended to having a wall calendar include the pages after the month of the incident, constructing openable windows, and wearing out-of-date clothing to obtain realistically worn fabric. The dioramas show tawdry and, in many cases, disheveled living spaces very different from Glessner Lee's own background. The dead include sex workers and victims of domestic violence.

Glessner Lee called them the Nutshell Studies because the purpose of a forensic investigation is said to be to "convict the guilty, clear the innocent, and find the truth in a nutshell." Students were instructed to study the scenes methodically—Glessner Lee suggested moving the eyes in a clockwise spiral—and draw conclusions from the visual evidence. At conferences hosted by Glessner Lee, prominent crime-scene investigators were given 90 minutes to study each diorama.


Alphabetical list of dioramas

 Attic (24 December 1946)
 Barn (15 July 1939)
 Blue Bedroom (3 November 1943)
 Burned Cabin (15 August 1943)
 Dark Bathroom (November 1896)
 Garage (7 January 1946)
 Kitchen (12 April 1944)
 Living Room (22 May 1941)
 Log Cabin (22 October 1942)
 Parsonage Parlor (23 August 1946)
 Pink Bathroom (31 March 1942)
 Red Bedroom (29 June 1944)
 Saloon & Jail (12 November 1944)
 Sitting Room & Woodshed (25 October 1947; thought lost and rediscovered in 2003)
 Striped Bedroom (29 April 1940)
 Three-Room Dwelling (1 November 1937)
 Two Rooms (damaged or destroyed in the 1960s)
 Two-Story Porch (5 April 1948)
 Unpapered Bedroom (4 June 1949)
 Woodman's Shack (8 February 1945)

Exhibition
A complete set of the dioramas was exhibited at the Renwick Gallery of the Smithsonian American Art Museum in Washington, DC from 20 October 2017 to 28 January 2018.

In popular culture
 The dioramas inspired CSI writers in their creation of the Miniature Killer, a serial murderer who leaves miniature dollhouses behind at crime scenes.
 Corinne Botz's book The Nutshell Studies of Unexplained Death (Monacelli Press, 2004) examines Lee's life and includes numerous photographs of the models.
 Susan Marks' documentary film Of Dolls and Murder looks at how the dioramas are still used as training material by the Baltimore Police Department.
 On 18 November 2017, the film Murder in a Nutshell: The Frances Glessner Lee Story was directed by Susan Marks and the film was premiered at the Renwick Gallery. Nora Atkinson, the Lloyd Herman Curator of Craft, moderated a discussion with Ms. Susan Marks.
 Season 17, episode 17 of NCIS titled "In a Nutshell" was based on Frances Glessner Lee's dioramas.
The Dollhouse Murders: A Forensic Expert Investigates 6 Little Crimes a 'fictionalized how-to manual of the whats, wheres, whys, whens and hows of detective, forensic and medical crime scene investigation' by author Thomas P Mauriello.
 Bruce Goldfarb's 18 Tiny Deaths: The Untold Story of Frances Glessner Lee & The Invention of Modern Forensics (2020) retells the story of Glessner Lee's life and her creation of the dioramas.
 Carol Guess' book Doll Studies: Forensics investigates the imagined lives of the victims in a series of prose poems (2012).

References

External links

 Nutshell Studies of Unexplained Death Image Gallery
 Death in Diorama
 Frances Glessner Lee (1878–1962), Biographies, Visible Proofs: Forensic Views of the Body, National Library of Medicine, 16 February 2006, updated 10 July 2006.
 Glessner House Museum
 "The Mother of CSI" Episode of Travel Channel's Mysteries at the Museum
 How A Doll-Loving Heiress Became The Mother Of Forensic Science
 , a video about the works by Vox Media

Dioramas
Harvard Medical School
Works about forensics
History of forensic science